Gunsmoke is an American Western television series developed by Charles Marquis Warren and based on the radio program of the same name. The series ran for 20 seasons, making it the longest-running Western in television history. The first episode aired in the United States on September 10, 1955, and the final episode aired on March 31, 1975. All episodes were broadcast in the U.S. by CBS. In the United Kingdom, Gunsmoke was originally broadcast under the title Gun Law.

Gunsmoke was originally a half-hour program filmed in black-and-white. The series expanded to an hour in length with season seven and began filming in color in season 12. During its run, 635 episodes were broadcast, of which 233 were 30 minutes and 402 were 60 minutes in length. Of the hour-long episodes, 176 were in black-and-white and 226 were in color. During season two, Gunsmoke became one of the 10 most popular programs on American television and moved to number one in the third season. It remained at number one until 1961 and stayed in the top 20 until 1964. The series returned to prominence in 1967 following a shift in its programming time from Saturday to Monday night. From there, Gunsmoke remained in the top 20 for the next seven years, dropping out only in its final season. In May 1975, CBS canceled the series. Alan Wagner, the network's vice president at the time, said, "It's better to get rid of a program one year too soon than one year too late." Between 1987 and 1994, five television movies based on the series were aired by CBS.

Gunsmoke is set in and around Dodge City, Kansas, in the post-Civil War era and centers on United States Marshal Matt Dillon (James Arness) as he enforces law and order in the city. In its original format, the series also focuses on Dillon's friendship with three other citizens of Dodge City: Doctor Galen "Doc" Adams (Milburn Stone), the town's physician; Kitty Russell (Amanda Blake), saloon girl and later owner of the Long Branch Saloon; and Chester Goode (Dennis Weaver), Dillon's assistant. In season eight (1962–63), a fifth regular character was added to the cast: blacksmith Quint Asper (Burt Reynolds), who remained until the end of season 10 (1964–65). Dennis Weaver left the series during season nine (1963–64) and was replaced by Ken Curtis as Festus Haggen, who became deputy to Marshall Dillon. Both Chester and Festus appear together in the season nine episode "The Prairie Wolfer", and Festus had initially appeared the previous season, playing the same character as a quasi-outlaw helping Dillon track a killer in "Us Haggens". In season 11 (1965–66), another deputy, Clayton Thaddeus Greenwood (Roger Ewing), was added to the cast. Ewing's character was replaced in season 13 (1967–68) by Newly O'Brien (Buck Taylor). Amanda Blake left the series at the end of season 19 (1973–74) and was replaced in the final season by a new character, Miss Hannah, portrayed by Fran Ryan.

As of May 5, 2020, all episodes of Gunsmoke have been released on DVD, while two other collections contain selected episodes from all 20 seasons. All five television movies have been released on DVD, as well.

Series overview

Episodes
All episodes are listed in order of airdate.

Half-hour era
Episodes from seasons 1–6 (1955–1961) were 30 minutes. In total there were 233 half-hour black-and-white episodes; 39 episodes for each of the first five seasons, with 38 episodes in the 6th season.

Season 1 (1955–56) 
39 half-hour black-and-white episodes.
 Crew:
 Producer: Charles Marquis Warren
 Associate producer: Norman Macdonnell
 Cast:
 James Arness as Matt Dillon
 Dennis Weaver as Chester
 Milburn Stone as Doc
 Amanda Blake as Kitty

Season 2 (1956–57) 
39 half-hour black-and-white episodes.
 Crew:
 Producers: Charles Marquis Warren (episodes 40–49, 51–52, 57) and Norman Macdonnell (episodes 50, 53–56, 58–78)
 Cast:
 James Arness as Matt Dillon
 Dennis Weaver as Chester
 Milburn Stone as Doc
 Amanda Blake as Kitty

Season 3 (1957–58) 
39 half-hour black-and-white episodes.
 Crew:
 Producer: Norman Macdonnell
 Cast:
 James Arness as Matt Dillon
 Dennis Weaver as Chester
 Milburn Stone as Doc
 Amanda Blake as Kitty

Season 4 (1958–59) 
39 half-hour black-and-white episodes.
 Crew:
 Producer: Norman Macdonnell
 Cast:
 James Arness as Matt Dillon
 Dennis Weaver as Chester
 Milburn Stone as Doc
 Amanda Blake as Kitty

Season 5 (1959–60) 
39 half-hour black-and-white episodes.
 Crew:
 Producer: Norman Macdonnell
 Cast:
 James Arness as Matt Dillon
 Dennis Weaver as Chester
 Milburn Stone as Doc
 Amanda Blake as Kitty

Season 6 (1960–61) 
38 half-hour black-and-white episodes.
 Crew:
 Producer: Norman Macdonnell
 Associate producer: James Arness
 Cast:
 James Arness as Matt Dillon
 Dennis Weaver as Chester
 Milburn Stone as Doc
 Amanda Blake as Kitty

One-hour black-and-white era
Seasons 7–11
1961/62 through 1965/66
176 one-hour black-and-white episodes
All two-parters counted as two individual hour-long episodes

Season 7 (1961–62) 
Thirty-four one-hour black-and-white episodesProducer: Norman Macdonnell; associate producer: Frank Paris Regular cast: James Arness (Matt Dillon), Dennis Weaver (Chester), Milburn Stone (Doc), Amanda Blake (Kitty)Guest cast: In credits order

Season 8 (1962–63) 
Thirty-eight one-hour black-and-white episodesProducer: Norman Macdonnell; associate producer: Frank Paris Regular cast: James Arness (Matt Dillon), Dennis Weaver (Chester), Milburn Stone (Doc), Amanda Blake (Kitty), Burt Reynolds (Quint Asper)Guest cast: In credits order

Season 9 (1963–64)
36 one-hour black-and-white episodes.
 Producer: Norman Macdonnell
 Associate producer: Frank Paris
 Cast:
 James Arness as Matt Dillon
 Dennis Weaver as Chester
 Milburn Stone as Doc
 Amanda Blake as Kitty
 Ken Curtis as Festus
 Burt Reynolds as Quint Asper

Season 10 (1964–65) 
Thirty-six one-hour black-and-white episodesProducer: Norman Macdonnell (episodes 342–348, 350, 352, 361, 367), Philip Leacock (episodes 349, 351, 353–360, 362–366, 368–377); associate producer: Frank Paris Regular cast: James Arness (Matt Dillon), Milburn Stone (Doc), Ken Curtis (Festus), Amanda Blake (Kitty), Burt Reynolds (Quint Asper)Guest Cast: In credits orderNote: A new and different gunfight introduction is shown before the opening director/writer credits

Season 11 (1965–66)
Thirty-two one-hour episodes, black-and-whiteProducer: Philip Leacock; associate producer: John MantleyRegular cast: James Arness (Matt Dillon), Ken Curtis (Festus), Milburn Stone (Doc), Amanda Blake (Kitty), Roger Ewing (Thad)Guest Cast: In credits order

One-hour color era
Seasons 12–20
1966/67 through 1974/75
226 one hour color episodes
(All two or three-parters counted as two or three individual hour-long episodes)

Season 12 (1966–67) 
Twenty-nine one-hour color episodesExecutive producer: Philip Leacock; producer: John Mantley Regular cast: James Arness (Matt Dillon), Ken Curtis (Festus), Milburn Stone (Doc), Amanda Blake (Kitty), Roger Ewing (Thad)Guest cast: In credits orderNote: CBS cancelled the series due to low ratings. However, letters of protest and pressure from his wife persuaded William S. Paley, the network's chief executive, to reinstate Gunsmoke for a thirteenth season.

Season 13 (1967–68) 
Twenty-five one-hour color episodesProducer: John Mantley; associate producer: Joseph Dackow Regular cast: James Arness (Matt Dillon), Ken Curtis (Festus), Milburn Stone (Doc), Amanda Blake (Kitty), Buck Taylor (Newly)Guest cast: In credits orderNote: Gunsmoke began its thirteenth season in a new timeslot (Mondays at 7:30 PM eastern time). With this the series returned to being among the top ten highest rated programs, where it remained for the next six seasons.

Season 14 (1968–69) 
Twenty-six one-hour color episodesProducer / executive producer: John Mantley; associate producer: Joseph Dackow Regular cast: James Arness (Matt Dillon), Ken Curtis (Festus), Milburn Stone (Doc), Amanda Blake (Kitty), Buck Taylor (Newly)Guest cast: In credits order

Season 15 (1969–70) 
Twenty-six one-hour episodes, colorExecutive producer: John Mantley; producer: Joseph Dackow Regular cast: James Arness (Matt Dillon), Ken Curtis (Festus), Milburn Stone (Doc), Amanda Blake (Kitty), Buck Taylor (Newly)

Season 16 (1970–71) 
Twenty-four one-hour episodes, colorExecutive producer: John Mantley; producer: Joseph Dackow (episodes 516–528), Leonard Katzman (episodes 529–539) Regular cast: James Arness (Matt Dillon), Ken Curtis (Festus), Milburn Stone (Doc), Amanda Blake (Kitty), Buck Taylor (Newly)Note: "Pike", the two-part episode that ended the season, was later developed into a spin-off series entitled Dirty Sally.

Season 17 (1971–72) 
Twenty-four one-hour episodes, color Executive producer: John Mantley; producer: Leonard Katzman; associate producer: Ron Honthaner Regular cast: James Arness (Matt Dillon), Ken Curtis (Festus), Milburn Stone (Doc), Amanda Blake (Kitty), Buck Taylor (Newly)

Season 18 (1972–73) 
Twenty-four one-hour episodes, color Executive producer: John Mantley; producer: Leonard Katzman; associate producer: Ron Honthaner.Regular cast: James Arness (Matt Dillon), Milburn Stone (Doc), Amanda Blake (Kitty), Ken Curtis (Festus), Buck Taylor (Newly)

Season 19 (1973–74) 
Twenty-four one-hour episodes, color Executive producer: John Mantley; producer: Leonard Katzman; associate producer: Ron Honthaner Regular cast: James Arness (Matt Dillon), Ken Curtis (Festus), Milburn Stone (Doc), Amanda Blake (Kitty), Buck Taylor (Newly)

Season 20 (1974–75) 
Twenty-four one-hour episodes, colorExecutive producer: John Mantley; producer: Leonard Katzman (episodes 612-624, 635), John G. Stephens (episodes 625-634); associate producer: Ron Honthaner Regular cast: James Arness (Matt Dillon), Ken Curtis (Festus), Milburn Stone (Doc), Buck Taylor (Newly), Fran Ryan (Hannah)

Television movies (1987–1994)

Home media releases
All twenty seasons of Gunsmoke and all five reunion films are available on DVD in Region 1. Two box sets—The 50th Anniversary Collection and The Director's Collection—have been released on DVD in Region 1.

Notes 

  A. "David S. Peckinpah" is a pseudonym for Sam Peckinpah.
  B. "Shimon Bar-David" is a pseudonym for Shimon Wincelberg.
  C. "Arthur Dales" is a pseudonym for Howard Dimsdale.

External links

See also 
 List of Gunsmoke radio episodes

Notes

Footnotes 
  Text was copied from Gunsmoke Wiki, which is released under a Creative Commons Attribution-Share Alike 3.0 (Unported) (CC-BY-SA 3.0) license.

References 

Lists of American Western (genre) television series episodes
Gunsmoke